Qarah Gol or Qareh Gol may refer to:
 Qarah Gol, Meshgin Shahr, Ardabil Province
 Qarah Gol, Moradlu, Meshgin Shahr County, Ardabil Province
 Qarah Gol, Charuymaq, East Azerbaijan Province
 Qareh Gol, Malekan, East Azerbaijan Province
 Qareh Gol-e Olya, Fars Province
 Qareh Gol-e Sofla, Fars Province
 Qarah Gol-e Gharbi, Golestan Province
 Qarah Gol-e Kalleh, Golestan Province
 Qarah Gol-e Sharqi, Golestan Province
 Qarah Gol-e Takhteh-ye Vasat, Golestan Province
 Qarah Gol, Kurdistan
 Qarah Gol, Divandarreh, Kurdistan Province
 Qarah Gol, North Khorasan
 Qareh Gol, Razavi Khorasan
 Qarah Gol, Bukan, West Azerbaijan Province
 Qareh Gol, Khoy, West Azerbaijan Province
 Qarah Gol, Khodabandeh, Zanjan Province
 Qarah Gol, Mahneshan, Zanjan Province